Gubernatorial elections took place in 11 out of the 26 provinces of the Democratic Republic of the Congo on 26 August 2017, with a second round held in three provinces on August 29. Elections in three other provinces were not held until 21 December 2017. The elections occurred after several governors had been dismissed. Applications of potential candidates were submitted to the Independent National Electoral Commission from 21 to 25 July 2017, with a period for the review of the applications from 26 to 30 July. On August 2, the list of candidates was published and the following two days were granted for any appeals. More than half of the provinces were won by candidates of the Alliance of the Presidential Majority, though some went to independent opposition candidates.

Governors are elected by provincial assemblies.

Results by province
The results are listed by province.

References

2017
Democratic Republic of the Congo gubernatorial elections
Gubernatorial elections
Democratic Republic of the Congo gubernatorial elections
Democratic Republic of the Congo gubernatorial elections